The Miss Ecuador 1999 was held on April 16, 1999. There were 19 candidates for the national title; in the end of night Soraya Hogonaga from Pichincha crowned to Carolina Alfonso from Pichincha as Miss Ecuador 1999. The Miss Ecuador competed at Miss Universe 1999.

Results

Placements

Special Awards

Contestants

Notes

Debuts

 Cañar

Returns

Last compete in:

1979
 Pastaza
1980
 Bolívar
 Galápagos
1992
 Tungurahua
1996
 Cotopaxi
 El Oro
 Napo
1997
 Azuay
 Imbabura

External links
http://www.missecuador.net/home/index.php?option#com_content&task#view&id#88&Itemid#52

http://www.explored.com.ec/noticias-ecuador/la-corona-se-disputa-hoy-17082-17082.html
http://www.geocities.ws/fotitos2000/Nomina.html

Miss Ecuador
1999 beauty pageants
Beauty pageants in Ecuador
1999 in Ecuador